Arnaud Caffa (born 20 October 1998) is a French ice dancer. With his skating partner, Natacha Lagouge, he is the 2022 CS Ice Challenge silver medalist, 2022 International Challenge Cup champion, and 2023 World University Games bronze medalist.

Career

Early years 
Caffa began skating as a ten-year-old and started training in ice dancing two years later. His first partnership fell apart after three years.

His second partner was Justine Scache. The two competed in the novice category during the 2013–14 season and moved up to the junior ranks the following season. In the 2016–17 season, Scache/Caffa received an ISU Junior Grand Prix assignment and finished eleventh at the event, which took place in September 2016 in Ostrava, Czech Republic. Their partnership ended after four seasons when Scache retired from the sport.

Caffa teamed up with Canada's Maia Iannetta after a tryout in mid-May 2017 in Novi, Michigan. The two represented France in junior ice dancing at the Golden Spin of Zagreb and Ice Star.

2018–19 season 
After a year of training in the United States, Caffa returned to France in June 2018. He contacted French ice dancer Natacha Lagouge soon after her first partnership ended in November 2018. After trying out together in Lyon in late November and again in Paris in December 2018, he moved to Lyon at the end of January 2019 to begin their partnership.

2019–20 season 
Lagouge/Caffa made their competitive debut in September 2019, placing tenth at the 2019 CS Ondrej Nepela Memorial in Slovakia. In November, they won bronze at the Open d'Andorra and placed sixth at the Bosphorus Cup in Turkey. They were sixth at the French Championships.

2020–21 season 
Many events were cancelled in the 2020–21 season due to the COVID-19 pandemic. Lagouge/Caffa competed at only one international event, the 2020 CS Nebelhorn Trophy, where they placed fourth. They were coached by Olivier Schoenfelder, Muriel Zazoui, Marien de la Asuncion, Neil Brown, and Emi Hirai in Lyon, France.

2021–22 season 
Lagouge/Caffa decided to train under Maurizio Margaglio and Neil Brown in Helsinki, Finland.

In November, they took silver at the 2021 NRW Trophy in Germany and finished tenth at the 2021 CS Warsaw Cup in Poland. They placed fifth at the French Championships in December. In February, they won gold at the International Challenge Cup in the Netherlands.

2022–23 season 
Lagouge/Caffa won silver at the Britannia Cup in August, bronze at the Trophée Métropole Nice Côte d'Azur in October, and silver at the 2022 CS Ice Challenge in November. They will make their Grand Prix debut at the 2022 Grand Prix of Espoo in Finland.

Programs

With Lagouge

With Scache

Competitive highlights 
GP: Grand Prix; CS: Challenger Series; JGP: Junior Grand Prix

With Lagouge

With Iannetta

With Scache

References

External links 
 
 
 

1998 births
French male ice dancers
Living people
People from Les Lilas
Competitors at the 2023 Winter World University Games
Medalists at the 2023 Winter World University Games
Universiade medalists in figure skating
Universiade bronze medalists for France